A constant-resistance network in electrical engineering is a network whose input resistance does not change with frequency when correctly terminated.  Examples of constant resistance networks include:
 Zobel network
 Lattice phase equaliser
 Boucherot cell
 Bridged T delay equaliser

Electrical engineering
Physics-related lists